Nathaniel Adjei (born 21 August 2002) is a Ghanaian professional footballer who plays as a centre-back for Hammarby IF in Allsvenskan.

Early life
Born and raised in Teshie, Adjei started to play youth football with local club Danbort FC at age 13. The team competed in Division One League, Ghana's second tier.

Club career

Hammarby IF
On 13 August 2021, Ajdei joined Hammarby TFF in Sweden's third tier Ettan, the feeder team of Hammarby IF. He was signed on a one-year loan from Danbort, together with fellow Ghanaian player Emmanuel Agyeman Duah from Karela United.

On 11 July 2022, Adjei was promoted to Hammarby's first team, completing a permanent transfer from Danbort by signing a four and a half-year contract. On 17 September the same year, Adjei made his Allsvenskan debut in a 1–1 away draw against BK Häcken, in which he scored an own goal.

International career
Being part of the Ghanaian youth selections since 2018, Adjei was the vice captain of the Ghana national U17's.

Adjei was called up to the Ghana national U20's for the 2019 Africa U-20 Cup of Nations, at age 16.

He was also part of Ghana's squad in the 2021 Africa U-20 Cup of Nations. He played three games throughout the tournament, before suffering an injury ahead of the knockout stage, that Ghana went on to win through a 2–0 win in the final against Uganda.

Career statistics

Club

References

External links

2002 births
Living people
Ghanaian footballers
Association football defenders
Ghana youth international footballers
Hammarby Fotboll players
Hammarby Talang FF players
Allsvenskan players
Ettan Fotboll players
Ghanaian expatriate footballers
Expatriate footballers in Sweden
Ghanaian expatriate sportspeople in Sweden